Nicholas Snell may refer to:

 Nicholas Snell (died 1577), MP for Chippenham, Malmesbury and Wiltshire
Nicholas Snell (fl.1373-1388), MP for Stafford (UK Parliament constituency)